Irisarri is a surname. Notable people with the surname include:

Antonio José de Irisarri (1786–1868), Guatemalan statesman, journalist, and politician
Hermógenes Irisarri (1819–1886), Chilean poet, journalist, diplomat, and political figure
Jon Irisarri (born 1995), Spanish cyclist
Rafael Anton Irisarri, American composer, multi-instrumentalist, producer, and media artist

See also
Irissarry